Arcanobacterium hippocoleae is a species of bacteria. It is a gram-positive, facultatively anaerobic, club-shaped (coryneform) species first isolated from a vaginal discharge of a horse. The type strain of A. hippocoleae is CCUG 44697T (=CIP 106850T).

References

Further reading

External links
LPSN
Type strain of Arcanobacterium hippocoleae at BacDive -  the Bacterial Diversity Metadatabase

Actinomycetales
Bacteria described in 2002